The Sandon School is an 11-18 mixed comprehensive academy school of approximately 1250 students. It serves a rural area on the outskirts of Chelmsford, Essex, England, and previously specialised in Maths and Computing.

History
The Sandon School opened in 1955 and became an academy in 2011.

The school has also had multiple sex offenders over time.

In March 2018 an Ofsted inspection found it to be a good      school.

The school has a 25-hour teaching week. Jo Wincott, headmaster since 2004, retired in the summer of 2018. He has been succeeded by Andrew Weaver (2018–Present)

Facilities
Fully equipped fitness gym;

Two 4G astroturf pitches (This facility is operated for private evening and weekend bookings by Sandon Soccer Ltd.);

Two sports halls;

A gym;

A dance studio;

An all-weather long jump pit playing fields;

Aging science laboratories;

and a pond.

Notable former pupils
 Bon Harris and Douglas McCarthy of Nitzer Ebb
 James Graham, singer and member of the boyband Stereo Kicks
 George "Frederick James" Taylor, Record Producer and Head of Data at Warp Records.

House System
The school also has a house system, in which the students take part in events and in-school activities in order to earn 'House points' for their houses.

House motto: "Many Branches, One Root"

The 4 houses conceive of:

Blake

Glennie

Thompson

Russel

References 

Academies in Essex
Secondary schools in Essex
Schools in Chelmsford
Educational institutions established in 1955
1955 establishments in England